Emil Pohle (27 August 1885 – 30 March 1962) was a German architect. His work was part of the architecture event in the art competition at the 1928 Summer Olympics.

References

1885 births
1962 deaths
20th-century German architects
Olympic competitors in art competitions